Tayebi-ye Garmsiri-ye Jonubi Rural District is a rural district (dehestan) in the Central District of Kohgiluyeh County, Kohgiluyeh and Boyer-Ahmad Province, Iran. At the 2006 census, its population was 1,433, in 306 families. The rural district has 20 villages.

References 

Rural Districts of Kohgiluyeh and Boyer-Ahmad Province
Kohgiluyeh County